Västmanland ( or ), is a historical Swedish province, or landskap, in middle Sweden. It borders Södermanland, Närke, Värmland, Dalarna and Uppland.

Västmanland means "(The) Land of the Western Men", where the "western men" (västermännen) were the people living west of Uppland, the core province of early Sweden.

Administration 
The traditional provinces of Sweden serve no administrative or political purposes (except sometimes as sport districts), but are historical and cultural entities. In the case of Västmanland the corresponding administrative county, Västmanland County, constitutes the eastern part of the province.  The western part is in Örebro County where the municipalities of Hällefors, Lindesberg, Ljusnarsberg and Nora are located.

Heraldry 
The coat of arms was granted in 1560. At the time it featured one fire mountain, to represent the mine of Sala Municipality. Soon, their numbers were increased to three, to also symbolize the Lindesberg and Norberg/Skinnskatteberg mines and the present blazon was ratified in 1943. Blazon: "Argent, in base triple Mount Azure issuant from each Flames Gules." When crowned with a ducal coronet it represents the province. However rather different in size Västmanland County was granted the same CoA in 1943.

Geography 
The terrain is to the north and north-west rocky. In these parts the highest mountains are located: Älvhöjden with 422 meters, and Gillersklack with 408 meters.

In the other parts it consists mostly of plains.

The largest lake is Mälaren marking the southern border, Sweden's third largest lake.

National parks: Färnebofjärden

Western Västmanland traditionally belonged to the mining district of Bergslagen.

In 2014, the area around Ramnäs saw the largest forest fire in Sweden in modern times.

History 
The oldest city of Västmanland is Västerås, founded sometime around 990. The city was once the provincial capital, and from 1120 it became the seat of the diocese of Västerås. Västerås is today also the largest city in the province, with 140,000 inhabitants in the municipality.

After that Arboga, was chartered in the 12th century, Köping in 1474, Sala in 1624;  Lindesberg and Nora both in 1643, and finally Fagersta in 1944. With city status in Sweden being abolished in 1971, these are solely historical titles.

The mines of Norberg and Skinnskatteberg began being in use in the 14th century. The mine of Lindesberg was being cultivated in the early 16th century.

Dukes of Västmanland 
Since 1772, Swedish Princes have been created Dukes of various provinces. This is solely a nominal title.
 Prince Erik (1889–1918)

Culture 
Engelsberg Ironworks is a UNESCO World Heritage Site.

Notable residents
Johan Wilhelm Dalman (1787–1828), physician and naturalist
Carl Wilhelm von Scheele

 Mikael Mogren, Bishop

Sports

Västerås SK is the most successful Swedish bandy team with 20 titles as of 2017. Several Bandy World Championship finals have been played in Västerås.

Subdivisions
Västmanland was historically divided into districts. Within Bergslagen they were called mountain districts (bergslag), and in the rest of the province hundreds.

References

External links 

Västmanland — tourism website.
 Nordisk familjebok:  Västmanland article — from Nordisk familjebok (1922).

 
Provinces of Sweden